is a Japanese professor of Engineering and Applied Microfluidic Systems in University of Tokyo, and since 2007 as a professor at the Institute of Industrial Science (IIS) of the university (Director General of the institute from 2015 to 2018 ) has been conducting research on Microfluidics. 
He received his Ph.D. in engineering from the University of Tokyo (1993). Fujii was also Co-director of LIMMS-CNRS/IIS, a joint research lab between CNRS, France, and IIS, from 2007 to 2014. He served as the President of The Chemical and Biological Microsystems Society(CBMS).

Since April 2021, Fujii has been 31st president of the University of Tokyo, after succeeding Makoto Gonokami who retired in 2021, and about six months after taking office, he will formulate an action policy for running the University of Tokyo during his term in the 2020s (tentative name "To the Sea of Dialogue and Creation").

On 30 September 2021, Fujii announced "UTokyo Compass", as a statement of the guiding principles of the University of Tokyo, sub-titled "Into a Sea of Diversity: Creating the Future through Dialogue". He emphasizes that it is not only a mission statement like those announced by successive presidents each time they take office. He ideally presents UTokyo Compass as a basic framework for that scholars, researchers and students of the UTokyo sets the course with a view to solving global issues by fundamentally elaborating questions and dialogues from the standpoint of academics.
 
When Fujii took office as President of the UTokyo, he set "Diversity & Inclusion" as one of the pillars to formulate new action guidelines, and made an epoch-making personnel affairs in which the composition of directors of the new executive department (including the president) is a majority of women.

Fujii has served as an executive member of the Cabinet Office's Council for Science, Technology and Innovation (CSTI) since 2021.

His hobbies during his school days are music performance (especially fusion music, [[Soft rock|Adult-oriented rock) and swimming.

Notes 

a.  Fujii says that his motivation for Microfluidic Devices research was that when he was a senior research scientist at RIKEN in the late 1990s, his boss encouraged him to find a new research field.

References 

Living people
1964 births
Members of the International Alliance of Research Universities
Academic staff of the University of Tokyo
Presidents of the University of Tokyo
Research directors of the French National Centre for Scientific Research